The 7th Bodil Awards was held on 27 April 1954 at the World Cinema in Copenhagen, Denmark, honoring the best in Danish and foreign film of 1953.

The evening started with a preview screening of James Stewart and June Allyson starring in Anthony Mann's The Glenn Miller Story.

The award ceremony was a triumph for director Lau Lauritzen Jr., who had previously, albeit shared with Bodil Ipsen, received the Bodil for Best Danish Film three times: In 1949, for The Viking Watch of the Danish Seaman, in 1951, for Café Paradis (Paradise Cafe), and in 1952, for Det Sande Ansigt (The True Face). For his direction of Farlig Ungdom he took home the award for Best Danish Film for a fourth time, a record that would stand more than forty years until Lars von Trier in 1997 received his fourth Best Danish Film Bodil for Breaking the Waves.

Foreign films were well represented with René Clément's Forbidden Games winning the Bodil Award for Best European Film, and Julius Caesar directed by Joseph L. Mankiewicz winning the award for Best American Film.

Winners

Best Danish Film 
Farlig Ungdom directed by Lau Lauritzen Jr.

Best Actor in a Leading Role 
 in Hendes store aften

Best Actress in a Leading Role 
Tove Maës in

Best Actor in a Supporting Role 
Not awarded

Best Actress in a Supporting Role 
Not awarded

Best European Film 
Forbidden Games directed by René Clément

Best American Film 
Julius Caesar directed by Joseph L. Mankiewicz

References

Further reading

External links 
 7th Bodil Awards at the official Bodil Awards website

1953 film awards
1954 in Denmark
Bodil Awards ceremonies
1950s in Copenhagen
April 1954 events in Europe